Hugh Robertson was a Scottish professional footballer who scored 50 goals from 260 appearances in the English Football League playing as a centre forward for Burnley, Lincoln City and Leicester Fosse.

Robertson was born in Newmains, North Lanarkshire. He played for Southern League club Millwall Athletic before joining Burnley of the Football League First Division. After two seasons, Burnley were relegated and Robertson left for Second Division club Lincoln City. He was ever-present for the next two seasons, and returns of 17 and 22 goals made him the club's leading scorer in each. After leaving Lincoln at the end of the 1898–99 season, he rejoined Millwall Athletic, spent time on the books of Woolwich Arsenal without appearing in the Football League, and returned to Scotland with Dundee, before playing a few games on a trial basis for Leicester Fosse.

References

19th-century births
Year of death missing
Footballers from North Lanarkshire
Scottish footballers
Association football forwards
Millwall F.C. players
Burnley F.C. players
Lincoln City F.C. players
Arsenal F.C. players
Dundee F.C. players
Leicester City F.C. players
English Football League players
People from Newmains
Sportspeople from Wishaw